Reshmie Oogink (born 26 October 1989) is a Dutch taekwondo athlete.

She represented the Netherlands at the 2016 Summer Olympics in Rio de Janeiro, in the women's +67 kg. She won a bronze medal in middleweight at the 2017 World Taekwondo Championships.
She represented the Netherlands at the 2020 Summer Olympics in Tokyo, in the women's +67 kg coached by Edward Fong.

References

External links

1989 births
Living people
Dutch female taekwondo practitioners
Olympic taekwondo practitioners of the Netherlands
Taekwondo practitioners at the 2016 Summer Olympics
Sportspeople from Almelo
Universiade medalists in taekwondo
Universiade bronze medalists for the Netherlands
European Games competitors for the Netherlands
Taekwondo practitioners at the 2015 European Games
European Taekwondo Championships medalists
World Taekwondo Championships medalists
Medalists at the 2009 Summer Universiade
Medalists at the 2015 Summer Universiade
Medalists at the 2017 Summer Universiade
21st-century Dutch women